Idaho Legislative District 5 is one of 35 districts of the Idaho Legislature. It is currently represented by Senator David Nelson, Democrat of Moscow, Representative Bill Goesling, Republican of Moscow, and Representative Caroline Nilsson Troy, Republican of Genesee.

District profile (1992–2002) 
From 1992 to 2002, District 5 consisted of most of Latah County.

District profile (2002–2012) 
From 2002 to 2012, District 5 consisted of a portion of Kootenai County.

District profile (2012–2022) 
District 5 currently consists of all of Benewah and Latah Counties.

District profile (2022–) 
In December 2022, District 5 will consist of a portion of Kootenai County.

See also

 List of Idaho Senators
 List of Idaho State Representatives

References

External links
Idaho Legislative District Map (with members)
Idaho Legislature (official site)

05
Benewah County, Idaho
Latah County, Idaho